Merluccius patagonicus, the Patagonian hake, is a species of fish from the family Merlucciidae from the western South Atlantic which was described in 2003. However some authorities consider the distinguishing features of M. patagonicus to be within the range of variability for M. hubbsi and that M. patagonicus is therefore a synonym of M. hubbsi.

References

Merluccius
Fish described in 2003